Anil Rideegammanagedera (born 23 June 1976) is a Sri Lankan former cricketer. He played in 163 first-class and 99 List A matches between 1995/96 and 2016/17, scoring more than 6,500 first-class runs and taking 300 wickets.

References

External links
 

1976 births
Living people
Sri Lankan cricketers
Galle Cricket Club cricketers
Moors Sports Club cricketers
Nondescripts Cricket Club cricketers
Tamil Union Cricket and Athletic Club cricketers
Place of birth missing (living people)